Larry Mana'o is an American football coach, currently managing American Samoa.

Playing career
Mana'o played college soccer for the University of Puget Sound.

Managerial career
Following being assistant to Thomas Rongen, Mana'o took up management of American Samoa.

Mana'o has also managed the American Samoa women's national football team.

Personal life
Mana'o is father to Alma Mana'o, Ava Mana'o and Severina Mana'o, all of whom represent the American Samoa women's national team.

Managerial statistics

References

Year of birth missing (living people)
Living people
American soccer coaches
American Samoa national football team managers
American Samoan football managers
Place of birth missing (living people)